Mark H. Beaubien Jr. (October 30, 1942 – June 5, 2011) was a Republican member of the Illinois House of Representatives.  He represented the 52nd House district from 1996 to 2011, and prior to his death, served as Assistant Republican Leader.

He was a descendant of Mark Beaubien, the owner of Chicago's Sauganash Hotel.

References

External links
Illinois General Assembly - Representative Mark H. Beaubien Jr. (R) 52nd District official IL House website
Bills Committees
, voting record, and interest group ratings at Project Vote Smart
 
Assistant House Republican Leader Mark Beaubien at the Illinois House Republican Caucus
State Rep. Mark Beaubien Jr. collapses at Arlington Park, dies, Dave McKinney, Chicago Sun Times, June 6, 2011
Barrington area state Rep. Beaubien dies at 68, Steve Zalusky, Daily Herald, June 6, 2011
GOP state rep. dead at age 68, WGN-TV, June 6, 2011

1942 births
2011 deaths
Republican Party members of the Illinois House of Representatives
People from Waukegan, Illinois
21st-century American politicians